The 1979 Brisbane Rugby League premiership was the 72nd season of Brisbane's semi-professional rugby league football competition. Eight teams from across Brisbane competed for the premiership, which culminated in a grand final match between the Fortitude Valley and Southern Suburbs clubs.

Season summary 
Teams played each other three times, with 21 rounds of competition played. It resulted in a top four of Fortitude Valley, Eastern Suburbs, Southern Suburbs and Western Suburbs.

Teams

Finals

Grand Final 

Fortitude Valley 26 (Tries: C. Close, V. Wieland, P. McWhirter, J. McLeod. Goals: M. Neill 6. Field Goals: W. Lewis, R. Strudwick.)

Southern Suburbs 0

References

Rugby league in Brisbane
Brisbane Rugby League season